Yadi may refer to:

 Yadi, Iran, a village in Shavur District, Shush County, Khuzestan Province, Iran
 Yadi Qardash, a village in Central District, Germi County, Ardabil Province, Iran
 Yadier Molina (born 1982), Puerto Rican baseball player
 Reda Yadi (born 1963), Algerian swimmer
 Yadi Sakat, Siddi general who captured the Sewri Fort in Mumbai in 1689
 Yadi Sugandi, Indonesian cinematographer and director of the 2009 film Merah Putih
 Yadi Timo, Indonesian television actor in the soap opera Wulan
 Ade Yadi, Indonesian footballer in the club Persikas Subang
 Yadi, nickname for the personal name Yadier
 Yadi Bangoura (born 1996), Guinean footballer in the Belgian club SC Eendracht Aalst
 Yadi Mulyadi (born 2002), Indonesian player on the Indonesia national under-17 football team
 Yadi Sopian, Indonesian medalist in chess at the 2015 ASEAN Para Games

See also 
 Yadi Yadi, a 1995 EP by Australian singer-songwriter Anita Lane
 Yaadi, a spelling variant of Yardie
 Yaddi Bolagh (disambiguation), several people